Dashwood is an English surname. Notable people with the surname include:

Charles Dashwood (judge) (1842–1919), Australian public servant, judge and Government Resident of the Northern Territory
Charles Dashwood (Royal Navy officer) (1765–1847)
Francis Dashwood, 11th Baron le Despencer (1708–1781), English rake and politician
Gemma Dashwood (born 1977), Australian Paralympic swimmer
George Dashwood (disambiguation), multiple people
 George Dashwood (1669–1706), MP for Sudbury 1703–1705
 George Dashwood (1680–1758), MP for Stockbridge 1710–1713
 Sir George Dashwood, 4th Baronet (1786–1861), MP for Truro 1814–1818
 Sir George Dashwood, 5th Baronet (c. 1790–1862), English landowner, Member of Parliament for Buckinghamshire 1832–1835 and Wycombe 1837–1863
 George Frederick Dashwood (1806–1881), public servant and politician in South Australia
 George Henry Dashwood (1801–1869), British antiquary
Robert Dashwood (disambiguation), multiple people
Sir Robert Dashwood, 1st Baronet, MP for Banbury
Sir Robert Dashwood, 9th Baronet
Sir Robert Henry Seymour Dashwood, 7th Baronet (1876–1947), of the Dashwood baronets
Rosamund Dashwood (1924–2007), Canadian long-distance runner
Tenille Dashwood (born 1989), Australian professional wrestler
Thomas Dashwood (1876–1929), English cricketer

Fictional characters:
Elinor Dashwood, character in Jane Austen's novel Sense and Sensibility
Marianne Dashwood, character in Jane Austen's novel Sense and Sensibility
Mike Dashwood, character in The Bill, 1984-1992

See also
Dashwood baronets, British baronetcies

English-language surnames